Stockyard Point is a rural town in the Livingstone Shire, Queensland, Australia. It is within the locality of Stockyard.

History 
The town was named by the Queensland Place Names Board on 5 January 1970.

References 

Shire of Livingstone
Towns in Queensland